Ian Fahey (born 29 June 1994) is an Irish Gaelic footballer who plays as a centre-forward for the Tipperary senior team.

Life
Born in Clonmel, County Tipperary, Fahey first arrived on the inter-county scene at the age of sixteen when he first linked up with the Tipperary minor team before later joining the under-21 side. He made his senior debut during the 2013 championship. Fahey immediately became a regular member of the starting fifteen and has won one National League (Division 4) medal.

At club level Fahey is a one-time championship medal with Clonmel Commercials. He also plays soccer for Clonmel Celtic.

Honours

Player

Clonmel Commercials
Tipperary Senior Football Championship (1): 2012

Tipperary
National Football League (Division 4) (1): 2015
Munster Under-21 Football Championship (1): 2015
All-Ireland Minor Football Championship (1): 2011
Munster Minor Football Championship (2): 2011, 2012

References

1994 births
Living people
Clonmel Commercials Gaelic footballers
Tipperary inter-county Gaelic footballers